Chaani is a Tanzanian village, located in the northern part of Unguja, the main island of the Zanzibar Archipelago. It belongs to the Zanzibar North Region.

External links
 Googlemaps: Chaani

Populated places in Zanzibar